John W. Stephens (October 13, 1834 – May 21, 1870) was a state senator from North Carolina. He was stabbed and garroted by the Ku Klux Klan on May 21, 1870. This killing began the Kirk–Holden war.

Personal life and early career
Born John Walter Stephens near Bruce's Crossroads (now Summerfield) in Guilford County, North Carolina, he was the oldest child of Absalom Stephens and his wife, Letitia. Stephens had four siblings, three brothers and a sister.

His family moved to Rockingham County when Stephens was still young, living first in Wentworth, the county seat, and then in Leaksville. Stephens' father, a tailor by trade, died in 1848, while the family was living in Leaksville.

Stephens married his first wife, Nannie Walters, in 1857. Only two years later, she died, leaving Stephens a widower, and the single father of an infant daughter, Nannie. Living in a Wentworth hotel in 1860, he married Martha Frances Groom. From this marriage, his daughter Ella was born.

Said to have been a member of the Methodist Church at Wentworth, Stephens also served for a time as an agent for the American Bible and Tract Society though he was barely literate. Soon after, he became a tobacco trader, moving to York, South Carolina.

Civil War
Early on in the American Civil War, Stephens was based in Greensboro, North Carolina. He served the Confederacy by commandeering horses for the Confederate army. Later, he moved back to Wentworth, and worked as what was known as an "impressment agent", mustering draftees for the Confederate army. Toward the end of the war, Stephens signed up for the armed forces, but it is unclear whether he actually saw action during this time.

Post-war
At the conclusion of the war, Stephens returned to Wentworth, and once more worked as a tobacco trader. It was during this time that the incident that would lead his political enemies to refer to him as "Chicken Stephens" occurred. Accounts of this incident vary greatly, even amongst historians. Much of the variance apparently depends upon the view the historian takes regarding Stephens' later political actions. 

In all versions of the story, Stephens shoots and kills chickens on his own property. The accounts diverge as to Stephens' motives in shooting the chickens. One account states that it was a simple misunderstanding and that Stephens had thought the wayward chickens were his own. In his history of North Carolina, Professor William Powell presents a picture of Stephens as a vindictive man, who killed the chickens almost purely out of spite or greed.

The stories converge again when dealing with what happened after Stephens shot the chickens. All accounts have Wentworth merchant and postmaster Thomas Anderson Ratliffe, the owner of the chickens, complaining to the sheriff, and Stephens spent a night in jail. Upon release, he confronted Ratliffe his next-door neighbor, sporting a seven-shot revolver. During the altercation, the gun was discharged (whether intentionally or accidentally is again a matter where accounts vary), and two bystanders were wounded. Records do not indicate that Stephens ever spent further time in jail regarding this matter, but the dismissive nickname by which his enemies would refer to him the rest of his life and even to this day was established then and  there at Wentworth.

Political career

Due to his unpopularity in Wentworth, Stephens moved to the adjacent Caswell County seat of Yanceyville in 1866, continuing to work as a tobacco trader, and also beginning to serve as an agent for the Freedmen's Bureau. He became a member of the Republican Party, as well as the Union League. As part of these organizations, he helped to politically organize the majority black population. These activities made many enemies for him amongst the conservative white Democrats of the state, who were fighting to prevent freedmen from gaining political rights, and especially so in Caswell County.

With the support of most African Americans, Stephens was elected to the North Carolina Senate in 1868, defeating Democrat Bedford Brown, who had been a U.S. Senator before the war and was popular among former Confederates. During this time, Stephens became nearly completely ostracized socially by and from the white community of Caswell County, even to the extent that he was supposedly expelled from the Yanceyville Methodist Church. Many unsubstantiated rumors were circulated amongst the white population regarding his personal life, including claims that he was a spy for Governor William W. Holden, attempted to bribe local citizens, and had burned the crops and barns of fellow citizens loyal to the Confederacy. White conservative Democrats claimed Stephens had murdered his own mother, who died under the most "unusual circumstances." However, none of these claims ever resulted in any form of legal action against Stephens, which limited the claims' impact.

Due to threats against his life raised during this period, Stephens was known to always be well armed. Additionally, it was said that he took out a quite substantial life insurance policy (worth a reported $10,000) on himself.

Assassination by the Ku Klux Klan
Stephens' political activities greatly angered the Ku Klux Klan in Caswell County. The Klan held a "trial" in absentia of Stephens, in which he was convicted and a death sentence verdict was rendered. Claims were made by Klan members that Stephens was given a "vigorous defense", though no evidence in this regard has ever been proffered. It was under the auspices of this "verdict" that the assassination of May 21, 1870 was carried out.

According to news accounts from around that time, the assassination was carried out in a backroom of the Caswell County Courthouse in Yanceyville. Stephens was in attendance at a Democratic gathering, in an attempt to convince a prominent Democrat to run for Sheriff as a Republican. The man he was attempting to sway signalled to him from the floor of the hall and Stephens followed him downstairs. Knowing Stephens' reputation for being quite well armed, his Klan assassins had assembled between eight and twelve men who lay in wait in a darkened room on the Caswell County Courthouse's first floor. After a search by family and friends Stephens' lifeless body was discovered in the first-floor room the following day. There were multiple versions of the assassination published in the American media; The Charleston Daily News reported that his body was found with a rope around his neck, his throat cut in two places, and a knife body wound, while The Daily Phoenix reported that his body was discovered with 40 gunshot wounds.

Legacy
The legacy of the life lived by John Stephens is quite complicated. Stephens, like many white Republican officeholders during early Reconstruction, faced intense opposition from white-owned newspapers and returning Confederates, who opposed Black political rights — which generated an endless stream of rumors and invective against him, the veracity of which is unclear.

William Powell is not alone in his negative characterization of Stephens. Much local folk history characterizes Stephens as, at best, a misguided miscreant, and at worst a criminally craven opportunist. What is clear from all accounts is that Stephens did work extensively with the Freedmen's Bureau and the Union League. It is such associations — as well as his political organization of the black population — that cause the wide divergence in popular opinion surrounding his legacy.

Those who view him as little more than an opportunist often point out that he only joined the above organizations after the South was defeated, and the political winds shifted. During the War, however, he had worked in support of the Confederacy, leading modern historians like Phillips to take a more cynical view of his later support of the freedmen and the Union League. A significant number of former Confederates opted to join the Republican Party after the war, and some, such as James Longstreet and James L. Alcorn, became "scalawags" at least partly in the interest of national reconciliation.

The dichotomy with which historians view Stephens aside, there is no question that he had the broad support of the Black community of the time and that he was murdered in the basement of a courthouse by the Klan for his political views and for assisting freed slaves.

No likeness of Stephens is known to exist. An engraving said to be that of Stephens and published in a few local and state histories in the late twentieth century has been proven by family members in recent years to be that of someone else.

See also
List of assassinated American politicians
Lynching of George Taylor in Rolesville, North Carolina
Lynn Council of  Wake County, North Carolina - In 1952, in an effort to get a confession, Lynn police stage a lynching
Lynching of Red Roach in Roxboro, North Carolina

Bibliography
Notes

References 

 
 - Total pages: 231 

1834 births
1870 deaths
1870 murders in the United States
Republican Party North Carolina state senators
Assassinated American politicians
Victims of the Ku Klux Klan
People from Summerfield, North Carolina
People murdered in North Carolina
People from Wentworth, North Carolina
People of North Carolina in the American Civil War
People from Yanceyville, North Carolina
19th-century American politicians
People from Eden, North Carolina
Lynching deaths in North Carolina
Tobacco in the United States
American tobacco industry executives
19th-century American businesspeople
Deaths by strangulation in the United States
Ku Klux Klan in North Carolina